Brandone Edward Francis Ramírez (born September 10, 1994) is a Dominican professional basketball player for Acunsa GBC of the Liga ACB. He played college basketball for the Texas Tech Red Raiders and the Florida Gators.

College career
Francis redshirted his freshman season at Florida for academic reasons. As a redshirt freshman, he averaged two points in 10.8 minutes per game. Francis transferred to Texas Tech, sitting out his following season due to National Collegiate Athletic Association (NCAA) transfer rules. As a junior, Francis averaged 5.1 points and 1.9 rebounds per game. At the 2019 NCAA Division I Championship Game, his final college appearance, he scored a team-high 17 points in an 85–77 overtime loss to first-seeded Virginia. As a senior, Francis averaged 6.5 points, 2.4 rebounds and 1.4 assists per game.

Professional career
On August 15, 2019, Francis was selected by Metros de Santiago with the first overall pick in the Dominican Liga Nacional de Baloncesto draft. One week later, he signed his first professional contract with the team. Francis led Metros to the league championship game. In 21 appearances, he averaged 11.3 points per game. On November 20, 2019, Francis signed with the Iowa Wolves of the NBA G League. In 20 games, he averaged 2.8 points in 8.4 minutes per game. Francis tested positive for and recovered from COVID-19 in June 2020. On August 9, he signed with Gipuzkoa of the Spanish Liga ACB.

He is currently playing for Prawira Harum Bandung in the Indonesian Basketball League (IBL).

Personal life
Francis' father, Bobby, played college basketball for Boston College in the 1980s. Bobby later worked as a brand strategist in the entertainment industry, developing a close relationship with rapper Nipsey Hussle. Francis' mother, Kenia Ramírez, lives in the Dominican Republic. He met her for the first time in two years during senior night at Texas Tech in 2019.

References

External links
Florida Gators bio
Texas Tech Red Raiders bio

1994 births
Living people
Dominican Republic expatriate basketball people in Spain
Dominican Republic expatriate basketball people in the United States
Dominican Republic men's basketball players
Florida Gators men's basketball players
Gipuzkoa Basket players
Iowa Wolves players
Liga ACB players
People from La Romana, Dominican Republic
Shooting guards
Small forwards
Texas Tech Red Raiders basketball players